Richard Rycroft (born 28 June 1960) is an English actor and comedian, best known for his role as Maester Wolkan on the HBO series Game of Thrones.

Career
Rycroft first started his acting career in 2001. He has appeared in several British drama television series, including: EastEnders, Casualty, Holby City and Doctors. He also featured in the films The Turn and Bridget Jones's Baby. In August 2007, he started stand-up comedy, and was a finalist in the 2010 Laughing Horse new act of the year competition.

In 2016, he joined the cast of Game of Thrones, appearing in the sixth, seventh and eighth seasons as Maester Wolkan. His other work includes parts in the television series Wolf Hall, Secret Smile, Not Going Out and Apple Tree Yard. In 2017, he lent his voice to the Fighting Fantasy audio dramas, in which he voiced the character Throm.

Filmography

Film

Television

References

External links 
 

1960 births
Living people
21st-century English male actors
English male television actors
English male film actors